Eckersley is a surname. Notable people with the surname include:

Adam Eckersley (footballer) (born 1985), English footballer
Adam Eckersley (musician), Australian singer, guitarist and songwriter
Bill Eckersley (1925–1982), English footballer
Charles Ewart Eckersley (1892–1967), English teacher and author
David Eckersley, English rugby player
Dennis Eckersley (born 1954), American baseball player
Julie Eckersley, Australian actress, comedian and writer
Nathaniel Eckersley (1815–1892), English mill-owner, banker and Conservative Party politician
Ned Eckersley, (born 1989), English cricketer
Neil Eckersley (born 1964), British judoka
Peter Eckersley (cricketer) (1904–1940), English cricketer, Conservative Party politician
Peter Eckersley (engineer) (PP Eckersley) (1892–1963), pioneer of British broadcasting
Peter Eckersley (TV producer) (1935–1981), British television producer, Head of Drama at Granada Television
Peter Eckersley (computer scientist) (1979-2022), Australian computer scientist, computer security researcher and activist.
Richard Eckersley (designer) (1941–2006), graphic designer known for experimental computerized typography
Richard Eckersley (footballer) (born 1989), English footballer
Robyn Eckersley, Australian political scientist
Ronald Eckersley (born 1925), English cricketer
Scott Eckersley, Democratic nominee in United States House of Representatives elections in Missouri, 2010
Thomas Eckersley FRS (1886–1959), English theoretical physicist and engineer
Tom Eckersley (1914–1997), English poster artist and design teacher
Tom Eckersley (footballer) (born 1991), English footballer

See also
Eckersweiler
Kearsley
Keresley
Wickersley